The Citadel Bulldogs basketball teams represented The Citadel, The Military College of South Carolina in Charleston, South Carolina, United States.  The program was established in 1900–01, and has continuously fielded a team since 1912–13.  Their primary rivals are College of Charleston, Furman and VMI.

1994–95

|-
|colspan=7 align=center|1995 Southern Conference men's basketball tournament

1995–96

|-
|colspan=7 align=center|1996 Southern Conference men's basketball tournament

1996–97

|-
|colspan=7 align=center|1997 Southern Conference men's basketball tournament

1997–98

|-
|colspan=7 align=center|1998 Southern Conference men's basketball tournament

1998–99

|-
|colspan=7 align=center|1999 Southern Conference men's basketball tournament

References
 

The Citadel Bulldogs basketball seasons